Monster Truck Races:

October 1996 US Hot Rod Monster Jam Fright Night V.

Tom Meents In Monster Patrol lost the rear springs and would be finished for the race weekend. 
Tony Farrell made history in his debut with Wild Thang, losing the front body racing Grave Digger. Grave Digger lost the motor and was done for the night. 
David Morris In Equalizer won the race over Wild Thang with only half the body.

Quad Wars: Team Louisville led by Rich Tompkins won over Team New York won by Dan Allen

NCAA Division I Men's Tournament games played at Freedom Hall

1958–1963
1958 Final Four
Kentucky 61, Temple 60 (national semifinal) 
Seattle 73, Kansas State 51 (national semifinal)
Temple 67, Kansas State 57 (national third place)
Kentucky 84, Seattle 72 (national championship)

1959 Final Four
West Virginia 94, Louisville 79 (national semifinal) 
California 64, Cincinnati 58 (national semifinal)
Cincinnati 98, Louisville 85 (national third place)
California 71, West Virginia 70 (national championship)

1962 Final Four
Ohio State 84, Wake Forest 68 (national semifinal) 
Cincinnati 72, UCLA 70 (national semifinal) 
Wake Forest 82, UCLA 80 (national third place)
Cincinnati 71, Ohio State 59 (national championship)

1963 Final Four
Loyola 94, Duke 75 (national semifinal) 
Cincinnati 80, Oregon State 46 (national semifinal) 
Duke 85, Oregon State 63 (national third place)
Loyola 60, Cincinnati 58 (national championship, overtime)

1967–1976
1967 Final Four
Dayton 76, North Carolina 62 (national semifinal) 
UCLA 73, Houston 58 (national semifinal) 
Houston 84, North Carolina 62 (national third place)
UCLA 79, Dayton 64 (national championship)

1969 Final Four
Purdue 92, North Carolina 65 (national semifinal) 
UCLA 85, Drake 82 (national semifinal) 
Drake 104, North Carolina 84 (national third place)
UCLA 92, Purdue 72 (national championship)

1976 Midwest Regional
Michigan 80, Notre Dame 76 (regional semifinal)
Missouri 86, Texas Tech 75 (regional semifinal)
Michigan 95, Missouri 88 (regional final)

1983 Midwest Regional First and Second Rounds
Georgetown 68, Alcorn State 63 (first round, 5 seed vs. 12 seed)
Iowa 64, Utah State 59 (first round, 7 seed vs. 10 seed)
Memphis 66, Georgetown 57 (second round, 4 seed vs. 5 seed)
Iowa 77, Missouri 63 (second round, 7 seed vs. 2 seed)

1987 Southeast Regional
Georgetown 70, Kansas 57 (regional semifinal, 1 seed vs. 5 seed)
Providence 103, Alabama 82 (regional semifinal, 6 seed vs. 2 seed)
Providence 88, Georgetown 73 (regional final, 6 seed vs. 1 seed)

1991 Southeast Regional First and Second Rounds
Pittsburgh 76, Georgia 68 (first round, 6 seed vs. 11 seed, overtime)
Kansas 55, New Orleans 49 (first round, 3 seed vs. 14 seed)
Florida State 75, Southern California 72 (first round, 7 seed vs. 10 seed)
Indiana 79, Coastal Carolina 69 (first round, 2 seed vs. 15 seed)
Kansas 77, Pittsburgh 66 (second round, 3 seed vs. 6 seed)
Indiana 82, Florida State 60 (second round, 2 seed vs. 7 seed)

NCAA Division I Women's Tournament games played at Freedom Hall
2010 Kansas City Regional First and Second Rounds
 First round (in order of play):
 (5) Michigan State 72, (12) Bowling Green 62
 (4) Kentucky 83, (13) Liberty 77
 Second round:
 (4) Kentucky 70, (5) Michigan State 52

NCAA Division II Men's Tournament games played at Freedom Hall
2013 Elite Eight
 Quarterfinals (in order of play): Four games (teams TBD)
 Semifinals (in order of play): Two games (teams TBD)
 The 2013 final will be held at Philips Arena in Atlanta as part of the celebrations of the 75th NCAA Division I men's tournament.

NCAA Conference Tournaments played at Freedom Hall
Metro Conference—1980, 1981, 1985, 1986, 1987, 1992, 1993, 1995
Conference USA—2001, 2003
NIT first and second rounds – 2002, 2006

Professional basketball at Freedom Hall
The Kentucky Colonels of the American Basketball Association played their home games in Freedom Hall for six seasons, from the fall of 1970 until the ABA–NBA merger in June 1976.  The Colonels moved to Freedom Hall after playing their first three seasons at the Convention Center (1967–68 through 1969–70).

The first female to play in a professional basketball game did so on the floor of Freedom Hall during a Kentucky Colonels game.  Penny Ann Early, an aspiring jockey, briefly entered the game for the Kentucky Colonels against the Los Angeles Stars on November 28, 1968.

The 1972 ABA All-Star Game was played at Freedom Hall on January 29, 1972.  15,738 fans attended; the East, coached by Kentucky Colonels coach Joe Mullaney, defeated the West 142–115.  The game's Most Valuable Player was the Kentucky Colonels' Dan Issel.

Many ABA playoff games were held at Freedom Hall including the Kentucky Colonels winning the 1975 American Basketball Association Championship at Freedom Hall.  The following ABA playoff games were played at Freedom Hall:
1971: Games 1, 2 and 5 of the 1971 Eastern Division Semifinals (Kentucky Colonels over The Floridians 4 games to 2); Games 1, 3 4 and 6 of the 1971 Eastern Division Finals (Kentucky Colonels over the Virginia Squires, 4 games to 2); and Games 3, 4 and 6 of the 1971 American Basketball Association Championship (Utah Stars over the Kentucky Colonels 4 games to 3).
1972: Games 1, 2 and 5 of the 1972 Eastern Division Semifinals (New York Nets over the Kentucky Colonels, 4 games to 2).
1973: Games 1, 2 and 5 of the 1973 Eastern Division Semifinals (Kentucky Colonels over the Virginia Squires 4 games to 1); Games 3, 4 and 6 of the 1973 Eastern Division Finals (Kentucky Colonels over the Carolina Cougars 4 games to 3); and Games 1, 2, 5 and 7 of the 1973 American Basketball Association Championship (Indiana Pacers over the Kentucky Colonels, 4 games to 3).
1974: Games 1 and 2 of the 1974 Eastern Division Semifinals (Kentucky Colonels over the Carolina Cougars, 4 games to 0); Games 3 and 4 of the 1974 Eastern Division Finals (New York Nets over the Kentucky Colonels 4 games to 0). 
1975: 1975 one-game playoff for 1975 First Place in the Eastern Division (Kentucky Colonels 108, New York Nets 99); Games 1, 2 and 5 of the 1975 Eastern Division Semifinals (Kentucky Colonels over the Memphis Sounds, 4 games to 1); Games 1, 2 and 5 of the 1975 Eastern Division Finals (Kentucky Colonels over the Spirits of St. Louis, 4 games to 1); and Games 1, 2 and 5 of the 1975 American Basketball Association Championship (Kentucky Colonels over the Indiana Pacers, 4 games to 1).
1976: Games 1 and 3 of the 1976 First Round Miniseries (Kentucky Colonels over the Indiana Pacers, 2 games to 1); Games 3, 4 and 6 of the 1976 Semifinals (Denver Nuggets over the Kentucky Colonels, 4 games to 3).  The Colonels' final game was played in this series, a 133–110 loss at Denver on April 28, 1976.

Games and scores
In addition, the Kentucky Colonels played several exhibition games against teams from the National Basketball Association in Freedom Hall, winning nine and losing five, including:
September 22, 1971: Kentucky Colonels 111, Baltimore Bullets 85 (attendance, 13,821)
October 8, 1971: Milwaukee Bucks 99, Kentucky Colonels 93 (attendance over 18,000)
October 9, 1971: New York Knicks 112, Kentucky Colonels 100 (attendance, 12,238)
October 1, 1972: Milwaukee Bucks 131, Kentucky Colonels 100
October 6, 1972: Phoenix Suns 103, Kentucky Colonels 91
October 7, 1972: Baltimore Bullets 95, Kentucky Colonels 93
September 21, 1973 Kentucky Colonels 110, Houston Rockets 102
September 22, 1973 Kentucky Colonels 110, Kansas City–Omaha Kings 99
October 1, 1974 Kentucky Colonels 118, Washington Bullets 95
October 8, 1974 Kentucky Colonels 109, Detroit Pistons 100
October 12, 1974 Kentucky Colonels 93, Chicago Bulls 75
October 8, 1975 Kentucky Colonels 93, Golden State Warriors 90 (the Colonels and Warriors were the defending ABA and NBA Champions, respectively)
October 10, 1975 Kentucky Colonels 96, Milwaukee Bucks 91
October 14, 1975 Kentucky Colonels 120, Buffalo Braves 116

Non-sports events

VEX Robotics World Championships
2015 VEX Robotics World Championship – April 15, 2015 – April 18, 2015
2016 VEX Robotics World Championship – April 20, 2016 – April 23, 2016
2017 VEX Robotics World Championship – April 19, 2017 – April 25, 2017 
2018 VEX Robotics World Championship – April 25, 2018 – May 1, 2018
2019 VEX Robotics World Championship – April 24, 2019 – April 30, 2019

Concerts

Other events
National Quartet Convention – annually in September
WCW Uncensored (1999)
WWF Judgment Day 2000
Promise Keepers 2006
National FFA Convention 1999–2005
Professional Bull Riders Bud Light Cup 2002
Monster Jam

Events in Louisville, Kentucky
History of Louisville, Kentucky
Louisville, Kentucky-related lists
Lists of events in the United States
Lists of events by venue